Gloria Richie Weber (April 4, 1933 – January 21, 2020) was an American politician who served in the Missouri House of Representatives from the 99th district from 1993 to 1995.

She died on January 21, 2020, in Ballwin, Missouri at age 86.

References

1933 births
2020 deaths
Democratic Party members of the Missouri House of Representatives
Women state legislators in Missouri